2021 Vegalta Sendai season.

Squad 
As of 14 January 2022.

J1 League

League table

Match details 

*In order to prevent coronavirus, the number of visitors will be increased in stages.

Meritorious Player Award 

 Hisato Satō

References

External links 

  J.League official site

Vegalta Sendai
Vegalta Sendai seasons